Lorne Plante (born May 13, 1984) is a former Canadian football centre. He most recently played for the Winnipeg Blue Bombers of the Canadian Football League. He was signed as an undrafted free agent by the BC Lions in 2006. He played CIS football for the Manitoba Bisons.

External links
Just Sports Stats

1983 births
Living people
BC Lions players
Canadian football offensive linemen
Manitoba Bisons football players
Players of Canadian football from Manitoba
Canadian football people from Winnipeg
Winnipeg Blue Bombers players